The 1985 Bendix Brake Trans-Am Racing Series was the twentieth running of the Sports Car Club of America's premier series. Buick, despite having notable success in 1985, would never see another Trans Am victory.

Results

Championship standings (Top 10)

References

Trans-Am Series
Trans-Am